William Vosburgh (December 16, 1890 – August 25, 1953) was an American water polo player. He competed in the men's tournament at the 1920 Summer Olympics. In 1981, he was inducted into the USA Water Polo Hall of Fame.

References

External links
 

1890 births
1953 deaths
American male water polo players
Olympic water polo players of the United States
Water polo players at the 1920 Summer Olympics
Sportspeople from Oak Park, Illinois